The 1996 NCAA Division I Men's Swimming and Diving Championships were contested in March 1996 at the Texas Swimming Center at the University of Texas in Austin, Texas at the 73rd annual NCAA-sanctioned swim meet to determine the team and individual national champions of Division I men's collegiate swimming and diving in the United States.

Hosts Texas topped the team standings, the Longhorns' sixth men's title (and first since 1991, the last time the championships were held in Austin).

Team standings
Note: Top 10 only
(H) = Hosts
(DC) = Defending champions
Full results

See also
List of college swimming and diving teams

References

NCAA Division I Men's Swimming and Diving Championships
NCAA Division I Swimming And Diving Championships
|NCAA Division I Men's Swimming And Diving Championships
NCAA Division I Men's Swimming and Diving Championships